Shams Bandar Naif Al-Aslami (born 28 April 1980), known simply as Shams, is an arab singer of Persian Gulf  and actress. She dropped her Arab citizenship denouncing her Arab and Gulf culture and origins, gaining citizenship of Saint Kitts and Nevis instead.

Career

Early beginnings
Her singing career began with the formation of a popular band at the end of the nineties of the twentieth century , while her actual beginning was when she signed a contract with "Ranad Audio Company", which took over the release of her first album, entitled "Habib Al Ward" in 2001 ,  and was supervised by the Saudi composer Ahmed Cheetah. She continued to present her songs in the Gulf dialect, and released her second album in 2002 , and the artist chose the song "Seven Times" to shoot a video clip , and the name of the song is the same as the title of her new album.  Shams collaborated again with the Saudi artist Khaled Abdel Rahman after collaborating with him on her first album, where the second song on the album was "Hala" from his words and composition.

Rise to fame
In 2007, she released two albums in two versions, the first in the Gulf dialect and the second in the Egyptian dialect, "Shams Khaleeji" and "Shams Masri", produced by the American Surprise Company, and she is the first Arab singer to sign a contract with an American production company . A large group of writers in the Gulf countries and Egypt took turns writing the lyrics for the two songs , as well as the melodies and distribution, containing 22 songs, 12 Egyptian songs and ten Gulf songs. This case is the first in the Arab world and the Gulf.In partnership with the Saudi Mohammed Abdo, she released a single titled "The Great Wall of Kuwait" in September 2007 , and the music was filmed in the Surra area in Kuwait under the production of Al-Watan TV .
Music Studio released her album Sabahak Khair in 2012. The album includes 17 songs in which Shams collaborated with several composers, including Michel Fadel and Nasser Al-Saleh . Shams repeated her collaboration with director Jamil Jamil Al-Maghazi, as he directed her song 24 Hours, which she filmed as a video clip, in order to promote the album.
She entered the world of sports songs dedicated to football fans with her song “Nasrawi Lataklamni” after the popularity of the “Leader Latakalni” tag, which was launched by the fans of the Saudi Al-Nasr Club at the end of 2013 , where she released her song on March 23, 2014, and achieved a quarter of a million within a week.  Her song Nasrawi Latakalni was broadcast on Saudi TV, becoming the first female singer to have her voice appear on Channel One after more than thirty years of suspension.
Shams claimed in an interview on Al Arabiya in 2015 , that she had given up her Gulf citizenship and currently holds a British and French green card. Her first acting career was in 2018,  when she participated in the comedy series ( Awad Aba A’Jed (series), which is broadcast by MBC channel in Ramadan , starring Asaad Al-Zahrani and Habib Al-Habib .

References

21st-century Saudi Arabian women singers
Living people
Rotana Records artists
1980 births
Kuwaiti women singers
Naturalised citizens of the United Kingdom
Naturalized citizens of France
Saudi Arabian film actresses
Saudi Arabian television actresses
Kuwaiti film actresses
Kuwaiti television actresses